Jack Segal (October 19, 1918 – February 10, 2005) was a pianist and composer of popular American songs, known for writing the lyrics to Scarlet Ribbons. His composition May I Come In? was the title track for a Blossom Dearie album. Other songs he authored or co-authored are When Sunny Gets Blue, That's the Kind of Girl I Dream Of, I Keep Going Back to Joe's (with Marvin Fisher), A Boy from Texas, a Girl from Tennessee (with John Benson Brooks & Joseph Allan McCarthy), After Me (with Blossom Dearie) and When Joanna Loved Me (with Robert Wells). It has been estimated that his songs have helped sell 65 million records.

Lyrics for the ballad that was perhaps Segal's greatest hit, Scarlet Ribbons (with music composed by Evelyn Danzig Levine), were written in just 15 minutes in 1949, but the song languished until Segal presented it to Harry Belafonte five years later. Belafonte's recording was responsible for making the song a hit. At least 30 other artists have also recorded Scarlet Ribbons, including the Kingston Trio, Joan Baez, Sinéad O'Connor, the Lennon Sisters, Wayne Newton, Perry Como, and Dinah Shore.

His music was also featured in movie and television soundtracks such as Star Trek: Deep Space Nine.

In addition to the artists already mentioned, his songs have been recorded by Frank Sinatra, Frankie Laine, Cher, Barbra Streisand, Tony Bennett, Nancy Wilson, Rosemary Clooney, Al Jarreau and Nat King Cole.

Biography

Segal was born in Minneapolis, Minnesota and earned a bachelor's degree in political science from the University of Wisconsin, a master's degree from the New School for Social Research and also studied creative writing. He began his career in Paramount Pictures' music department and taught songwriting at Cal State Northridge and in University of Southern California continuing education classes. He died of natural causes at the age of 86 in Tarzana, Los Angeles, California. At the time of his death, he was married to Helen Segal, and was survived by his wife, his three sons, David, Mark and Jason, and a daughter, Jody Davis.

Compositions
 A Boy from Texas, a Girl from Tennessee
 After Me
 Bye Bye Barbara
 Here's To The Losers	
 I Keep Goin' Back To Joe's
 I'll Remember Suzanne (written with Dick Miles)
 Laughing Boy
 May I Come In?
 More Love
 No Spring This Year (written with Maddy Russell)
 Scarlet Ribbons (For Her Hair) 
 Something Happens to Me	
 Strings
 That's the Kind of Girl I Dream Of
 This God-Forsaken Day
 Too Soon Old—Too Late Smart 	
 What Are You Afraid Of
 When Joanna Loved Me
 When Sunny Gets Blue
 Who Started Love?
 Words and Music (written with Marvin Fisher)

Discography
 When Sunny Gets Blue, Scarlet Ribbons and Other Songs I Wrote (Goodnight Kiss Records, produced by Janet Fisher)

Notes
 Larkin, Colin: The Encyclopedia of Popular Music. Third edition. Macmillan 1998.
 Musicians' Union national directory of members 2001. Second edition. Musicians's Union 2001.

References

External links 
 
  Obituaries: Los Angeles Times, February 14, 2005: Jack Segal, 86; Lyricist Was Best Known for 'Scarlet Ribbons' 
 Obituaries: Boston Globe, February 18, 2005: Jack Segal
 "When Sunny Gets Blue, Scarlet Ribbons and Other Songs I Wrote (Goodnight Kiss Records)by Jack Segal" REVIEW by Paul Goldstein
 "When Sunny Gets Blue, Scarlet Ribbons, And Other Songs I Wrote CD" by Jack Segal
 Harry Fox Songfile: Retrieved September, 13, 2014

Jewish American songwriters
American jazz pianists
American male pianists
American jazz composers
American male jazz composers
Musicians from Minneapolis
Songwriters from Minnesota
1918 births
2005 deaths
20th-century American pianists
20th-century American composers
Jazz musicians from Minnesota
20th-century American male musicians
20th-century jazz composers
20th-century American Jews
21st-century American Jews
American male songwriters